Rafał Patyra (born 25 July 1974 in Lubartów) is a Polish sport journalist, who has worked in Telewizja Polska since 2003. He also worked for TVN and TV Puls.

In June 2006, Patyra was working at 2006 FIFA World Cup as a reporter. He was a member of TVP equipe.

External links
 TVP.pl 

1974 births
Polish television journalists
Polish sports journalists
Living people
People from Lubartów